James William "Bill" Grant (born September 21, 1943) is an American banker and former politician from Madison, Florida. From 1987 to 1991, he served two terms in the United States House of Representatives.

Biography 
A graduate of Florida State University, he  attended the University of Florida for graduate studies. He is a fifth generation Floridian whose family has lived in North Florida since before statehood. He is a former Member of the Florida State Senate and the United States Congress and his party’s nominee to the U.S. Senate. Prior to beginning his political career, he organized and ran several North Florida commercial banks and was twice elected president of the Florida Bankers Association.

Congress 
He represented  in the U.S. Congress from 1987 to 1991. After being elected as a Democrat from the Tallahassee-based 2nd District to succeed 12-term Democrat Don Fuqua, he switched parties to become a Republican on February 21, 1989.

He was defeated for reelection in U.S. House election, 1990 by Douglas Peterson, and ran unsuccessfully for the Senate in 1992, losing to incumbent Bob Graham.

Later career  
After leaving politics, he organized and is now CEO of MK Meridian, Inc, an international conflict resolution, trade, and diplomatic advisory firm. In that capacity, he has mediated numerous sovereign and commercial conflicts across Eastern Europe, the Middle East and Africa. He helped organize the United Africa Association, a 13-nation effort for promoting pan-African self-help, free-enterprise capitalism, and democracy. 

In 1997, with the assistance of the government of Egypt, he negotiated the end to the first Somali civil war and authored a draft constitutional government for that nation. He has been the senior advisor to two sovereign foreign governments and twice served as Special United States Congressional Envoy to international trouble spots. He served as Executive Vice President of Worldwide Chemical, LLC, a multi-faceted chemical production facility in Ukraine  with 11,000 employees and a worldwide market.

Family
Grant is married to the former Janet Krawiec; they have two children; Madison Kathleen and Kinsey Regan. He has two children from a previous marriage: John Alan and Carter Richmond.

See also
 List of American politicians who switched parties in office
 List of United States representatives who switched parties

External links
 
 

1943 births
American bankers
Florida State University alumni
Living people
People from Madison, Florida
University of Florida alumni
Florida Democrats
Republican Party members of the United States House of Representatives from Florida
Democratic Party members of the United States House of Representatives
Florida state senators
People from Lake City, Florida
Members of Congress who became lobbyists